"In Your Heart" is the first single released from A Place To Bury Strangers's major label debut album, Exploding Head. The single contains the lead track, along with two remixes and the B-side "Strictly Looks"

Track listing

References

2009 singles
2009 songs
Mute Records singles